The 43 Commando Fleet Protection Group Royal Marines (43 Cdo FP Gp RM), formerly Comacchio Company Royal Marines (1980–1983), Comacchio Group Royal Marines (1983–2001) and Fleet Protection Group Royal Marines (2001–2012), is a 550-man unit of the Royal Marines responsible for guarding the United Kingdom's nuclear weapons. The unit, based at HM Naval Base Clyde, is part of 3 Commando Brigade.

History

Second World War
Early Commando units were all from the British Army but by February 1942, the Royal Marines were asked to organize Commando units of their own, and 6,000 men volunteered.

43 Commando was formed in July 1943 after the decision was made to convert the battalions of the Royal Marine Division into commando units. The initial intake of personnel was drawn from the 2nd Battalion, Royal Marines, and following commando training at Achnacarry in Scotland, the unit consisted of about 450 men organized into a headquarters, five infantry troops consisting of three officers and 63 other ranks, along with a heavy weapons troop—armed with Vickers machine guns, 3-inch mortars and 6-pounder anti-tank guns—and a signals platoon.

Along with No. 2, No. 9 and No. 40 (Royal Marine) Commandos, 43 Commando formed the 2nd Special Service Brigade. Throughout the course of 1943–45, No. 43 (Royal Marine) Commando served in Italy, Yugoslavia and Greece.

Victoria Cross
Corporal Thomas Peck Hunter was posthumously awarded the Victoria Cross for his actions during Operation Roast at Lake Comacchio, Italy during the Second World War. Hunter cleared a farmhouse containing three Spandau machine-guns on his own, firing a Bren Gun from his hip. Hunter then proceeded to draw enemy fire until most of his troop had taken cover. The Commanding Officer, Lieutenant Colonel Ian Riches RM was awarded the DSO in this action.  He went on to be Commandant General Royal Marines between 1959 and 1962.

Re-formed
43 Commando RM was reformed at Stonehouse Barracks in 1961 "as a further contribution to the forces available for seaborne operations". The unit was disbanded again in 1968.

Comacchio Company 
On 1 May 1980, the Comacchio Company Royal Marines was formed - taking its name from the battle honour "Comacchio, Italy 1945", where Hunter posthumously received the Victoria Cross for his actions. On its formation, Comacchio Company took on the colours and traditions of the then-defunct 43 Commando. The company's purpose was to guard the UK's Naval nuclear weapons and be a maritime counter-terrorism unit for offshore installations, including oil rigs and ships. The company initially numbered around 424 personnel.

The Comacchio Company RM became Comacchio Group RM in November 1983. From 1987 onwards, Comacchio Group also ceased performing the maritime counter-terrorism role after a study transferred the task to the newly formed M-squadron of the Royal Marines Special Boat Service.

Fleet Protection Group Royal Marines 
The Comacchio Group RM was renamed Fleet Protection Group Royal Marines in March 2001, and was restructured into its current organisation. The Group also moved from RM Condor in Arbroath Angus (where it was co-located with 45 Commando) to HM Naval Base Clyde, which is situated near Helensburgh, Argyll and Bute (both in Scotland).

In 2012, FPGRM formally adopted the name 43 Commando Fleet Protection Group Royal Marines.

In 2016, it was announced that elements of the unit would be using the Colt Canada C8 carbine instead of the standard L85A2.

Tasks and organisation
The primary mission is to prevent unauthorised access to the UK's strategic nuclear deterrent through the provision of specialist military capability.  Additionally, maritime boarding and sniper teams and the 
very high readiness Fleet Contingent Troop are deployed world-wide to conduct specialist maritime security tasks in support of the Royal Navy.

43 Commando Fleet Protection Group Royal Marines is a Royal Marine Unit based at HM Naval Base Clyde in Scotland and is part of 3 Commando Brigade, the UK's high readiness expeditionary amphibious force.

As of 2016, 43 Commando Fleet Protection Group Royal Marines has over 550 personnel and is organised into several sub-units:
HQ headquarters squadron
O Rifle Squadron
P Rifle Squadron (reformed in 2018) 
R Rifle Squadron

Royal Navy Reserve Augmentation
Naval ratings of the Royal Naval Reserve have been attached to 43 Commando Fleet Protection Group Royal Marines to support the force protection tasks outside of the United Kingdom: this organisation was known as P Squadron but was disbanded with the force protection duties being transferred to the standing tasks commando unit, a duty which rotates annually between Commando units.

See also
 Royal Navy
 British Armed Forces
 Nuclear weapons and the United Kingdom
 Marine Corps Security Force Regiment

References

External links
 Official Website

43
Royal Marine formations and units
Military units and formations established in 1942
Military units and formations of the United Kingdom in World War II
United Kingdom nuclear command and control
Trident (UK nuclear programme)
1980 establishments in the United Kingdom